Donald L. Friedrich (July 7, 1929 - May 8, 2021) was an American politician in the state of Minnesota. He served in the Minnesota House of Representatives from 1975 to 1981 (district 32B).

References

1929 births
2021 deaths
Republican Party members of the Minnesota House of Representatives
Politicians from Rochester, Minnesota